Hyd, or HYD, may refer to:

 Hana Yori Dango, a Japanese manga and anime series
 Hayden Dunham, an American musician and artist
 Highways Department, a department of the Hong Kong Government
 Hydrogenation
 HYD, the China Railway pinyin code for Hengyang East railway station,
 HYD. the IATA code for Rajiv Gandhi International Airport serving Hyderabad, India
 HYD, the National Rail code for Heyford railway station in the county of Oxfordshire, UK

See also
 
 
 
 Hyde (disambiguation)
 Hyderabad (disambiguation)